David Miriambo Anyim (6 February 1965 – 24 September 2007) was a Kenyan boxer. He competed in the men's super heavyweight event at the 1992 Summer Olympics.

References

External links
 

1965 births
2007 deaths
Super-heavyweight boxers
Kenyan male boxers
Olympic boxers of Kenya
Boxers at the 1992 Summer Olympics
Boxers at the 1994 Commonwealth Games
Commonwealth Games silver medallists for Kenya
Commonwealth Games medallists in boxing
African Games bronze medalists for Kenya
African Games medalists in boxing
Place of birth missing
Competitors at the 1991 All-Africa Games
Medallists at the 1994 Commonwealth Games